The Netherlands was represented by Thérèse Steinmetz, with the song "Ring-dinge-ding", at the 1967 Eurovision Song Contest, which took place on 8 April in Vienna. Steinmetz was selected internally by broadcaster NOS and the song was revealed on 1 March as the winner of the Dutch final.

Before Eurovision

Nationaal Songfestival 1967
The national final was hosted by Leo Nelissen on 22 February from the Kloosterhoeve in Harmelen, the smallest town ever to play host to a Dutch final. The winning song was chosen by postcard voting, and on 1 March, this time from the Theater Orpheus in Apeldoorn, Steinmetz performed all six songs again before the results of the vote were announced. "Ring-dinge-ding" turned out to be the easy winner by a margin of well over 2,000 votes.

At Eurovision 
On the night of the final Steinmetz performed first in the running order, preceding Luxembourg. At the close of voting "Ring-dinge-ding" had received only 2 points (1 each from Ireland and the United Kingdom), placing the Netherlands joint 14th (with Austria and Norway) of the 17 entries, ahead only of the zero points entry from Switzerland. This continued the string of bad results the Netherlands had suffered throughout the 1960s. However the song has remained quite well remembered, as it is often cited as one of the classic examples of the facile "ring-ding-bang-boom" school of bouncy Eurovision songs particularly prevalent in the 1960s and 1970s.

The Dutch conductor at the contest was Dolf van der Linden.

Voting

External links 
 Dutch Preselection 1967

References 

1967
Countries in the Eurovision Song Contest 1967
Eurovision